Block Club Chicago is an online newspaper that reports local and neighborhood news in Chicago.  The website operates as a non-profit, subscription-based service.

After DNAinfo was shut down in November 2017, Block Club Chicago was founded by three former DNAinfo Chicago editors – Shamus Toomey, Stephanie Lulay, and Jen Sabella.  The new online publication was initially funded with a Kickstarter campaign and with capital from the Civil publishing platform.  Block Club Chicago went live on June 12, 2018.

References

External links

American news websites
Newspapers published in Chicago
2018 establishments in Illinois